Røysholmen is an islet between Rullesteinøya and Rugla in Tiholmane, part of Thousand Islands, an archipelago south of Edgeøya.

References

 Norwegian Polar Institute Place Names of Svalbard Database

Islands of Svalbard